William Gunter may refer to:

 Bill Gunter (born 1934), American politician from Florida
 William Gunter (martyr) (died 1588), Roman Catholic priest and martyr
 William B. Gunter (1919–1986), Georgia Supreme Court justice